Coleman Creek is a stream in the U.S. state of Oregon. It is a tributary to Bear Creek.

Coleman Creek was named after Mathew H. Coleman, an early settler.

References

Rivers of Oregon
Rivers of Jackson County, Oregon